Samsó can refer to one of two wine grapes:

Carignan, which is known as Samsó in Catalonia
Cinsault, which is also known as Samsó in parts of Catalonia, though more commonly as Sinsó

See also
Samsø, a Danish island
 Space And Missile Systems Organization (SAMSO), a predecessor of the Space and Missile Systems Center.